Tofa Lio Foleni (born ~1952) is a Samoan politician and former member of the Legislative Assembly of Samoa. He is a member of the Human Rights Protection Party.

Tofa is from the village of Saipipi in Savai'i. He worked for the Ministry of Education for 40 years and as a businessman. He was first elected to the Legislative Assembly in the 2016 Samoan general election and appointed Associate Minister of Women, Community and Social Development. He later became Associate Minister of Health. In June 2020 during the Covid-19 pandemic he was accused of hosting a gathering at his home in violation of Samoa's emergency regulations. He denied the breach.

He lost his seat in the 2021 election.

References

Living people
Members of the Legislative Assembly of Samoa
Human Rights Protection Party politicians
Year of birth missing (living people)
21st-century Samoan politicians